Kingdom of Austria is a misnomer, which may refer to:

 Archduchy of Austria
 Habsburg monarchy
 Austrian Empire